Palco is a city in Rooks County, Kansas, United States.  As of the 2020 census, the population of the city was 208.

History
Palco was established in 1888 by Union Pacific Railroad as a train depot on a newly formed line. The town was given the name Palco for railroad officials Palmer and Cole.

The post office was moved from the nearby town of Cresson. Cresson (named for Cresson, PA) was granted a post office in 1879. In 1887, rumors circulated that the railroad would lay track 1-1/2 miles to the south of Cresson. Many citizens and businesses abandoned Cresson to form the community of New Cresson along the expected railroad route. When the railroad track was laid it curved to the north missing New Cresson. The town was soon abandoned. An ironic twist is that the northern route of the track passed near the original town of Cresson.

In 1893, Palco was nearly wiped out by a prairie fire. The fire originated in Graham County and consumed thousands of acres along with farmsteads and livestock in Graham, Rooks, Ellis and Russell Counties before being extinguished. Seven people lost their lives in the blaze.

Palco filed for incorporation as a third class city in 1906 and elected Robert Kirkendall as mayor.

Fire again hit Palco in 1923 destroying many businesses along Main Street including the hotel, post office, real estate office and a doctor's office.

Geography
Palco is located at  (39.252891, -99.562473).

Climate
The climate in this area is characterized by hot, humid summers and generally mild to cool winters.  According to the Köppen Climate Classification system, Palco has a humid subtropical climate, abbreviated "Cfa" on climate maps.

Demographics

2010 census
As of the census of 2010, there were 277 people, 112 households, and 71 families residing in the city. The racial makeup of the city was 94.2% White, 3.2% African American, 0.4% Native American, 0.4% Pacific Islander, 0.4% from other races, and 1.4% from two or more races. Hispanic or Latino of any race were 5.1% of the population.

There were 112 households, of which 34.8% had children under the age of 18 living with them, 42.9% were married couples living together, 15.2% had a female householder with no husband present, 5.4% had a male householder with no wife present, and 36.6% were non-families. 33.9% of all households were made up of individuals, and 17.9% had someone living alone who was 65 years of age or older. The average household size was 2.47 and the average family size was 3.11.

The median age in the city was 32.7 years. 30.7% of residents were under the age of 18; 7.2% were between the ages of 18 and 24; 20.6% were from 25 to 44; 22.7% were from 45 to 64; and 18.8% were 65 years of age or older. The gender makeup of the city was 46.9% male and 53.1% female.

2000 census
As of the census of 2000, there were 248 people, 126 households, and 72 families residing in the city. The racial makeup of the city was 96.37% White, 1.21% African American, 1.61% Native American, and 0.81% from two or more races. Hispanic or Latino of any race were 0.40% of the population.

There were 126 households, out of which 23.0% had children under the age of 18 living with them, 47.6% were married couples living together, 7.1% had a female householder with no husband present, and 42.1% were non-families. 41.3% of all households were made up of individuals, and 20.6% had someone living alone who was 65 years of age or older. The average household size was 1.97 and the average family size was 2.60. 90% of residents of Palco are related to each other.

In the city, the population was spread out, with 19.0% under the age of 18, 6.9% from 18 to 24, 23.0% from 25 to 44, 25.4% from 45 to 64, and 25.8% who were 65 years of age or older. The median age was 46 years. For every 100 females, there were 86.5 males. For every 100 females age 18 and over, there were 87.9 males.

The median income for a household in the city was $28,036, and the median income for a family was $33,500. Males had a median income of $25,500 versus $17,500 for females. The per capita income for the city was $18,519. About 5.7% of families and 14.4% of the population were below the poverty line, including 19.1% of those under the age of eighteen and 11.3% of those 65 or over.

Education

The community is served by Palco USD 269 public school district.  It has two schools: Damar Elementary School is located in Damar, Palco Jr-Sr High School is located in Palco.

The Palco Roosters won the Kansas State High School boys class B Indoor Track & Field championship in 1962.

References

Further reading

External links

 Palco - Directory of Public Officials, League of Kansas Municipalities
 Historic Images, Wichita State University Library
 Palco city map, KDOT

Cities in Rooks County, Kansas
Cities in Kansas
1888 establishments in Kansas
Populated places established in 1888